360° is an EP by Canadian rapper Infinite, released in 1998, by independent label Lockdown Entertainment. The first single, "Gotta Get Mine", was nominated for Best Rap Recording at the 1998 Juno Awards. The music video for the second single, "Take a Look", won Best Rap Video at the 1999 MuchMusic Video Awards.

Track listing

Samples
"360°" contains a sample of "I Like" by Guy
"Take a Look" contains a sample of "The Mornings Come" by Mercy
"One Day" contains a sample of "Everybody Loves the Sunshine" by Roy Ayers
"Gotta Get Mine" contains a sample of "Missing You" by Diana Ross

References

1998 debut EPs
Albums produced by K-Cut (producer)
Hip hop EPs
Infinite (rapper) EPs